Statistics of Japanese Regional Leagues in the 1969 season.

Champions list

League standings

Kanto

Tokai

Kansai

1969
Japanese Regional Leagues
2